Ushasi Ray is an Indian TV actress and model. She is well known for her lead role as 'Ahona' in Star Jalsha's Milon Tithi as well as for playing the titular lead as 'Bokul' in Bokul Kotha. She has played the role 'Kadambini' in Zee Bangla's Kadambini. She recently made her debut in web series as 'Brinda' in Turu Love at Hoichoi. She also made her debut in cinema as Lakshmi in Iskaboner Rani which was aired on Zee Bangla Cinema. She studied in Kamala Girls' High School and graduated in from Asutosh College in Kolkata. She had started hosting some episodes of Zee Bangla Rannaghor not all but including Pohela Baishakh and others.

Career
Ushasi Ray started her career by playing the lead role in Star Jalsha's popular show Milon Tithi opposite to Jeetu Kamal. Then, she played a cameo role on Star Jalsha's Detective Show Jai Kali Kalkattawali. She also played the lead role in Zee Bangla's high ranking serial Bokul Kotha opposite to Honey Bafna. She also played the lead role in Zee Bangla's Kadambini opposite to Manoj Ojha. Her debut movie is "Ishkaboner rani" She also debut in web series name "Turu love" She also appeared in 2 more web series named "Byomkesh season 7(Chorabali) and Rudrabinar obhishaap as a Cameo. Her new web series "Sundarban er vidyasaagar would launch soon"

Television and awards

Web series

Television movies

Awards & Recognition

Mahalaya

References

External links
 

Living people
Actresses from Kolkata
Bengali television actresses
Bengali actresses
21st-century Indian actors
Year of birth missing (living people)
Asutosh College alumni